"There Will Never Be Another You" is a popular song with music by Harry Warren and lyrics by Mack Gordon that was written for the Twentieth Century Fox musical Iceland (1942) starring Sonja Henie and John Payne. The songs in the film featured Joan Merrill accompanied by Sammy Kaye and His Orchestra. The song was published in 1942. The most popular version, a 1966 Chris Montez recording, went to #4 on the Easy Listening chart and #33 on the Hot 100.

Recorded versions

References

External links
"There Will Never Be Another You" Jazz guitar lesson (melody, chords, solo, and harmonic analysis)
"There Will Never Be Another You" at JazzStandards.com, with musicological description and bibliography

1942 songs
1940s jazz standards
Songs with lyrics by Mack Gordon
Songs with music by Harry Warren
Songs written for films
Bluebird Records singles
Okeh Records singles